Tim Baker is a Canadian singer-songwriter from St. John's, Newfoundland and Labrador. The longtime lead singer of the indie rock band Hey Rosetta!, his debut solo album Forever Overhead was released on April 19, 2019, on Arts & Crafts.

Baker was educated at Concordia University, where he planned to study piano but came down with a case of tendonitis that prevented him from being able to play for his admission audition, and thus studied creative writing. Following his graduation, he returned to St. John's, where he began performing locally as a solo artist before deciding that his songs needed a fuller band sound and forming Hey Rosetta!

In 2016, Baker debuted his first solo song, "Spirit", on the CBC Radio news program The Current as part of a special series on the economic challenges of life in Newfoundland. The song appears on Forever Overhead.

In June 2019, Forever Overhead was named to the initial longlist for the 2019 Polaris Music Prize. At the Juno Awards of 2020, he received a nomination for Songwriter of the Year, for the songs "All Hands", "Dance" and "The Eighteenth Hole".

In July 2020, he released the Survivors EP.

On July 26, 2021, he performed his song "Songbirds" at the investiture of Mary Simon as Governor General of Canada.

In 2021 he duetted with Rose Cousins on a new re-recording of her song "The Lullaby (My Oldest Love)".

His second solo album, The Festival, was released on October 21, 2022. The album has 10 tracks in total, including the singles "Lucky Few," "Some Day," and "Echo Park." "Echo Park" was written during Baker's time as the lead singer of Hey Rosetta!

References

External links

Canadian male singer-songwriters
Canadian singer-songwriters
Canadian folk rock musicians
Canadian indie rock musicians
Canadian rock singers
Musicians from St. John's, Newfoundland and Labrador
Living people
Arts & Crafts Productions artists
Concordia University alumni
Year of birth missing (living people)
21st-century Canadian male singers